Emilia Gabriela Attias Tosta (born March 26, 1998), known professionally as Emily Tosta, is a Dominican actress, producer, dancer and singer. She is known for playing Lucia Acosta in the television series Party of Five.

Biography
Tosta was born in Santo Domingo, Dominican Republic. Her mother, Emilia Tosta, is Venezuelan and her father is Dominican. She moved to Miami when she was 12 to pursue a career in acting. In 2014, her family moved to Los Angeles.

Career
She has a recurring role as Leticia Cruz in Mayans M.C.. Her breakout role was as Lucia Acosta in the Freeform television series Party of Five.

She starred in the 2021 film Willy's Wonderland with Nicolas Cage and is set to star in Tito: Peace of Heaven.

Filmography

Television

Film

References

External links
 

Living people
1998 births
People from Santo Domingo
21st-century American actresses
Hispanic and Latino American actresses
American people of Dominican Republic descent
American people of Venezuelan descent
Dominican Republic people of Venezuelan descent
21st-century American women